Traveller Deluxe Edition is a 1981 role-playing game supplement published by Game Designers' Workshop, a boxed set edition for Traveller.

Contents
Traveller Deluxe Edition is a boxed set intended to make the Traveller system even easier to play and understand, and was designed more with the new player or beginner in mind than those looking for greater intricacies and complexities.

Reception
William A. Barton reviewed Traveller Deluxe Edition in The Space Gamer No. 44. Barton commented that "Deluxe Traveller is an excellent addition to the Traveller line – especially for the new player and referee.  And even the old-timer Travellers who want the second edition rules wouldn't go far wrong by going the extra price for the deluxe edition."

Andy Slack reviewed Deluxe Edition Traveller for White Dwarf #27, giving it an overall rating of 10 out of 10 for newcomers (but only a 4 for old hands), and stated that "the basics of characters, combat, ships, trade and worlds remain unchanged. While this edition provides more detail than the basic set, it doesn't supersede it ."

Reviews
Different Worlds #14 (Sep 1981)
 Pegasus #9 (Aug 1982)
 1981 Games 100 in Games

References

Role-playing game supplements introduced in 1981
Traveller (role-playing game) supplements